RARB may refer to:
 Recorded A Cappella Review Board
 Retinoic acid receptor beta, a human gene